Örn Clausen (8 November 1928 – 12 December 2008) was an Icelandic athlete who competed mainly in the decathlon. He was born in Reykjavík.

He finished 12th in the decathlon competition at the 1948 Summer Olympics.

Örn Clausen, a lawyer, was married to the lawyer and supreme court judge Guðrún Erlendsdóttir.

References

 

1928 births
2008 deaths
Orn Clausen
Orn Clausen
Orn Clausen
Orn Clausen
Athletes (track and field) at the 1948 Summer Olympics
European Athletics Championships medalists
Orn Clausen